Events from the year 1532 in France

Incumbents
 Monarch – Francis I

Events
 13 August – Union of Brittany and France: The Duchy of Brittany is absorbed into the Kingdom of France.
 Church of Royal Monastery of Brou completed.
 The Paris Parlement has the city's beggars arrested "to force them to work in the sewers, chained together in pairs".

Births
 19 February – Jean-Antoine de Baïf, poet and member of La Pléiade (died 1589)
 Étienne Jodelle, dramatist and poet associated with La Pléiade (died 1573)

Deaths
 Jeanne de la Font, poet and patron of culture (born 1500)
 Gilbert Nicolas, Catholic priest and member of the Order of Friars Minor (born c. 1462)

See also

References

1530s in France